The Heartland XV is one of several New Zealand representative rugby union teams, although it is at a lower level than the All Blacks and the Māori All Blacks. The side is drawn exclusively from players for provincial unions that compete in the Heartland Championship, a nominally amateur domestic competition below the fully professional Mitre 10 Cup.

History

Founded in 1988 and originally known as the New Zealand Divisional XV, it was designed to expose players from Divisions Two and Three in the Air New Zealand National Provincial Championship (NPC) to rugby at a higher level. Upon the 2006 reorganisation of the NPC into the Air New Zealand Cup and Heartland Championship, the side was revamped into a Heartland-only side and received its current name.

The first New Zealand Heartland XV side toured the Pacific Islands in 2005 and they played six games (which they won), including matches against Tonga and Fiji. Since then the team has toured Argentina in 2006 and the United States in 2008, beating the Pacific Coast Grizzlies and a USA Select XV. (The Divisional XV had previously toured Fiji in 1995 and 2004, and Cook Islands in 1988.)

Results

Notable past players

Recent Squads

2021
2021 Heartland XV Squad

FORWARDS

 Callum Burrell* (Mid Canterbury)
 Stefan Destounis (Poverty Bay) 
 Tokomaata Fakatava (South Canterbury) 
 Hone Haerewa (Ngāti Porou East Coast) 
 Campbell Hart (Whanganui) 
 James Higgins (Poverty Bay)
 Seta Koroitamana (Mid Canterbury) 
 Te Huia Kutia (Thames Valley) 
 Josh Lane* (Whanganui) 
 Connor McVerry (Thames Valley) 
 Manasa Bari Samo (Mid Canterbury) 
 Nick Strachan (South Canterbury) 
 Sam Sturgess (North Otago) 
 Vaka Taelega (South Canterbury) 
 Loni Toumohuni* (South Canterbury) 
 Sam Van Der Valk (Thames Valley)
 
BACKS

 Sireli Buliruarua (South Canterbury) 
 Craig Clare (Whanganui) 
 Paula Fifita (South Canterbury) 
 Te Rangi Fraser (Ngāti Porou East Coast) 
 Lindsay Horrocks (Whanganui) 
 Sam Parkes* (Ngāti Porou East Coast) 
 Zac Saunders* (South Canterbury)
 Timoci Seruwalu (Whanganui) 
 Lennix Tovo (Horowhenua Kapiti) 
 Hayden Todd (North Otago) 
 Raitube Vasurakuta (Mid Canterbury) 
 William Wright (South Canterbury) 
 Dane Whale* (Whanganui)
Denotes non-travelling reserve player

MANAGEMENT

 Nigel Walsh, Head Coach (South Canterbury)
 Jason Hamlin, Asst Coach (Whanganui) 
 Tony Harrison, Manager (Mid Canterbury) 
 Slade King, Trainer (King Country) 
 Geoff Thompson, Physio (South Canterbury) 
 Coll Campbell, Doctor (Poverty Bay)

2019

2019 Heartland XV Squad

FORWARDS
 Carl Carmichael (King Country)
 Troy Tauwhare (West Coast)
 Scott Cameron (Horowhenua Kapiti)
 Josh Clark (North Otago)
 Campbell Hart (Wanganui)
 Brett Ranga – captain (Thames Valley)
 Seta Koritamana (Mid Canterbury)
 Jeff Lepa (Buller)
 Glen McIntrye (Thames Valley)
 Ralph Darling (North Otago)
 Meli Kolinisau (North Otago)
 James Goodger (Wairarapa Bush)

BACKS
 William Wright (South Canterbury)
 James Lash (Buller)
 Willie Paiaaua (Horowhenua Kapiti)
 Sione Holani (West Coast)
 Peni Nabainvalu (Wanganui)
 Harry Lafituanai (Thames Valley)
 Craig Clare (Wanganui)
  Aaron Lahmert (Horowhenua Kapiti)
  Lindsay Horrocks (Wanganui)
  Timoci Serawalu (Horowhenua Kapiti)
  Kalavini Leatigaga (South Canterbury)

Coaches
 Barry Matthews (2016 and 2017) 
 Mark Rutene (2019) 
 Nigel Walsh, South Canterbury (2021)

See also
 RFU Championship XV
 New Zealand national schoolboy rugby union team
 New Zealand national under-19 rugby union team
 New Zealand national under-20 rugby union team
 New Zealand national under-21 rugby union team
 Junior All Blacks
 Maori All Blacks

References

External links
 

Heartland XV
Heartland Championship
New Zealand rugby union teams